Paul Jeffrey Vandervort (born February 5, 1985) is an American actor, film producer, and former model.

Vandervort first appeared on the hit reality television series "The Janice Dickinson Modeling Agency" during season 4. He is known on the modeling front, most notably for landing an international modeling campaign for Abercrombie & Fitch in 2008. Since, he has modeled for Ed Hardy, Zoom! Whitening, and Nike, as well as other companies.

One year after making his television debut, Vandervort continued to appear in various scripted TV shows and in 2010 made the switch to film appearing in several independent movies.

Vandervort wrote his first screenplay for a short film, Hollywood Miles, that he filmed in the Hollywood Hills in April 2014.

Paul made his first full-length feature film, "Limelight", a screenplay written by Vandervort that he also starred in. The movie filmed in Los Angeles and Bel Air in Summer 2015 and Worldwide sales rights for Limelight were acquired by Taylor & Dodge and the movie was officially released in 2018 on Amazon Prime, iTunes, Google Play, and others distributed by Freestyle Digital Media.

Vandervort also creates digital content for social media platforms and he currently has around 400,000 fans on popular app TikTok.

He currently resides in Los Angeles where he enjoys an active lifestyle. He enjoys surfing in Southern California and is on a fully plant-based diet as of early 2020.

Filmography

Films

Television

References

External links 
 

1985 births
Living people
American male television actors
American film producers
American chief executives in the media industry
American male film actors
American male screenwriters
Male models from Colorado
Male actors from Colorado

Participants in American reality television series
Reality modeling competition participants